Auburndale City Hall is a national historic site located at 1 Bobby Green Plaza, Auburndale, Florida in Polk County. The monument is a "L" shaped two-story brick building, built in 1927 in Italian Renaissance Revival style.

It was added to the National Register of Historic Places on December 24, 2013.

References

External links

National Register of Historic Places in Polk County, Florida
Auburndale, Florida
1927 establishments in Florida
Government buildings completed in 1927